The String Quartet is a short story written by Virginia Woolf and published in 1921.

References

External links 

Short stories by Virginia Woolf
1921 short stories